Autoroute 10 (A-10) is an Autoroute of Quebec in Canada that links greater Montreal to key population centres in Montérégie and Estrie, including Brossard, Saint-Jean-sur-Richelieu, Granby, and Sherbrooke.

The A-10 also provides access to popular winter resorts at Bromont, Owl's Head, Mont Sutton and Mont Orford. Motorists travelling on the A-10 can see eight of nine Monteregian Hills: Mount Royal, Mont Saint-Bruno, Mont Saint-Hilaire, Mont Saint-Grégoire, Mont Rougemont, Mont Yamaska, Mont Shefford and Mont Brome. The ninth, Mont Mégantic is located beyond the eastern terminus of the autoroute.

Description
The A-10 carries the name Autoroute Bonaventure (Bonaventure Expressway) from its start in Montreal's city centre to the Champlain Bridge. From there until its terminus in Sherbrooke, the A-10 is called the Autoroute des Cantons-de-l'Est (Eastern Townships Expressway), a reference to the historic name given to the region east of Montreal and north of the U.S. border.

The road's main material is asphalt concrete, many parts of the highway are bordered with gravel.

Autoroute Bonaventure
The A-10 begins in Downtown Montreal as an extension of University Street near Place Bonaventure. Two underground ramps provide an interchange with the R-136. At km 1, the A-10 crosses the Lachine Canal, then travels along the St. Lawrence River to an interchange with the A-15 and A-20. This interchange is partially on the Island of Montreal and partially on Nuns' Island. At km 2, it crosses (but does not provide access to) Route 112 at the north end of Victoria Bridge. The A-10 has mostly two lanes in each direction on the majority of its length and the speed limit is mostly 100 km/h. The A-10 is multiplexed with the A-15 and A-20 across the Champlain Bridge. All three autoroutes diverge soon after reaching the southern edge of the bridge.

The A-10 serves as an important link for commuters travelling to downtown Montreal from suburban South Shore communities via the Champlain Bridge. It also provides access to the Montreal Technoparc and the Concordia Bridge. The A-10 in Montreal is jointly owned by the city of Montreal, the Société Les Ponts Jacques Cartier, and Federal Bridge Corporation (an agency of the Government of Canada).

Autoroute des Cantons de l'Est
At km 8, the A-10 crosses Taschereau Boulevard. Bus lanes run in both directions along the median for four kilometers between the southern end of the Champlain Bridge and Milan Boulevard. Crossing Brossard, the A-10 runs along the northern edge of the Quartier DIX30 shopping complex before reaching interchanges with the A-30 at km 11 and the A-35 at km 22. The A-10 crosses the Richelieu River at km 28 and enters a rich agricultural region.

Between Bromont (km 74) and Magog (km 121) the A-10 passes through a mountainous region, close to two of Quebec's major ski centres (Mont Orford and Mont Brome). Near the northern end of Lake Memphremagog, the A-10 reaches an interchange with the A-55 at km 121. The A-10 continues east as a concurrency with A-55. Between km 123 and 128, Route 112 functions as a frontage road.

A-10 and A-55 bypass the city of Sherbrooke to the east and north, reaching interchanges with spur routes A-410 at km 140 and A-610 at km 143. The A-10 reaches its terminus at the junction with A-610, while A-55 continues north to Drummondville.

The portion east of Autoroute 55 (linking that autoroute with Route 112) was renumbered as Autoroute 610 on September 29, 2006.

History

Extending from the southern end of the Champlain Bridge to Magog, the highway replaced the old Quebec Route 1 (now Route 112) as the main road link between the two points. An official opening for the highway came one year later, in 1965. The A-10 was the second autoroute, after the Laurentian Autoroute outside Montreal, to be commissioned. Both were opened as toll highways by a Quebec government agency. The A-10 featured five toll stations (at current km 22, km 37, km 68, km 90, and km 115). Motorists were charged $1.50 to make the entire trip.

The Autoroute Bonaventure through Montreal opened in 1967 to link approach roads to Expo 67 with the Champlain Bridge.

The Autoroute des Cantons de l'Est was the first autoroute in Quebec to use exit numbers based on distance instead of in sequential order, as had previously been the case. As Canada had not yet adopted the metric system, exit numbers referenced the distance in miles from the southern end of the Champlain Bridge.

The A-10 did not originally have a route number. Instead, route marker signs featured a red triangular shield featuring the name of the route. Unusually, the directional signs were also originally red. Later, blue shields and signs replaced the red versions.

In 1985, the toll system was abolished, and the use of the triangular shields was discontinued. Blue directional signs have gradually been converted to standard green signs used elsewhere in North America. In 2013, motorists could still see blue signs at entrances to and exits of the autoroute.

Between 1988 and 2006, A-10 departed its multiplex with A-55 at km 143 and continued eastward for 11 km to a final terminus with Route 112. In October 2006, that section of A-10 was renumbered as A-610.

The city of Montreal announced in January 2013 that it would take over the SHM's responsibilities, citing concerns over transparency. The Société du Havre de Montréal (SHM) transformed the autoroute into an urban thoroughfare as part of a broader project to redevelop Montreal's harbourfront. Demolition of the autoroute’s elevated stretch began in July 2016 and the new Bonaventure Park was completed in September 2017.

Proposal
A proposal to build the East-West Highway across central and northern Maine calls for the A-10 to be extended to the U.S. border at Coburn Gore where it would meet the new highway. Doing so would create a new and more direct limited-access highway link between Maine, the Maritime Provinces through New Brunswick Route 1, and Quebec.

Exit list

References

External links

A-10 at motorways-exits.com
A-10 at Quebec Autoroutes
Steve Anderson's MontrealRoads.com: Bonaventure Autoroute (A-10)
Steve Anderson's MontrealRoads.com: Eastern Townships Autoroute (A-10)
Transports Quebec Map  

10
Roads in Montreal
Transport in Brossard
Transport in Granby, Quebec
Transport in Magog, Quebec
Transport in Sherbrooke
Former toll roads in Canada